is a Japanese manga series written and illustrated by Noriko Kasuya. It was adapted into a Japanese television drama series that premiered on TBS on 21 October 2011.

Cast
 Kyoko Fukada as Sena Asagi
 Naohito Fujiki
 Kenta Kiritani
 Arata Furuta
 Sei Ashina
 Kenichi Endō
 Yuriko Ishida
 Fumiyo Kohinata

References

External links
  

Japanese television dramas based on manga
2007 manga
2011 Japanese television series debuts
Kin'yō Dorama
Josei manga
Shueisha franchises
2011 Japanese television series endings